Clements Gap Conservation Park is a protected area located in the Mid North of South Australia about  west of Redhill,  north east of Port Broughton and 42 metres above sea level. Maintained by the South Australian Department of Environment, Water and Natural Resources (DEWNR), the park is classified as an IUCN Category III Natural Monument or Feature. The park is named for the surrounding farming locality of Clements Gap, a reference to the co-located pass through the Barunga Range. The Clements Gap pass in turn is thought to be named after a shepherd in the area prior to 1880, per research by local historian Rodney Cockburn.

History
In 1963 eight sections (439-442 and 565-568) of the Hundred of Mundoora (north east corner) were set aside and designated Mundoora Conservation Park. In 1981 the park was renamed to its present designation.

See also
 Protected areas in South Australia
Field Naturalists Society of South Australia

References

Conservation parks of South Australia
1963 establishments in Australia